The discography of British singer-songwriter Whitey consists of seven studio albums, three extended plays, fourteen singles and three music videos. As a producer Whitey also has several remixes and songs made.

Making his debut as solo singer in 2003, during the last ten years Whitey had passed through several music labels, ending up as independent musician, who creates and sells recordings by himself. Due to the lack of promotion almost all his releases were not represented in any major chart, except the "Non Stop / A Walk in the Dark" single, which peaked at number 67 in the UK Singles Chart in 2005.

Albums

Studio albums

Compilation albums

Canceled albums
Stay on the Outside (2008) 
Bare Bones (2013)
Pick Up Your Shadow (2015)
Square Peg, Round World (2015)

Extended plays

Singles

Videography

Music videos

Other appearances

Compilation albums

Production

Remixes

Notes

References

External links
 Official Bandcamp page
 Whitey at AllMusic
 

Discographies of British artists
Electronic music discographies
Rock music discographies